Maurice Kallert (18 June 1920 – 30 May 2000) was a French racing cyclist. He rode in the 1950 Tour de France.

References

1920 births
2000 deaths
French male cyclists
Place of birth missing